The Epitome de Caesaribus is a Latin historical work written at the end of the 4th century.

It is a brief account of the reigns of the Roman emperors from Augustus to Theodosius the Great. It is attributed to Aurelius Victor, but was written by an anonymous author who was very likely a pagan. The author used the so-called Enmannsche Kaisergeschichte and the (now lost)  Annales of Virius Nicomachus Flavianus (a friend of Quintus Aurelius Symmachus). Although very brief in length and not always reliable, it also contains some useful information such as how the late Romans perceived the Sassanian wars and descriptions of the affairs of the Tetrarchy as well as anecdotes of various emperors. The work also shows numerous anachronisms and inaccuracies, such as referring to Caracalla as the father of the later emperor, Elagabalus, a rumour perpetuated by the Severan dynasty.

Bibliography 

 Jörg A. Schlumberger: Die Epitome de Caesaribus. Untersuchungen zur heidnischen Geschichtsschreibung des 4. Jahrhunderts n. Chr., C.H. Beck, Munich 1974.

External links 
Epitome de Caesaribus (Latin text)
Epitome de Caesaribus (English translation)

4th-century Latin books
Roman Empire in late antiquity
Latin works about history
Works about ancient Rome